Cacostola cana is a species of beetle in the family Cerambycidae. It was described by Marinoni and Martins in 1982. It is known from Brazil.

References

Cacostola
Beetles described in 1982